

Iran Pro League

Aboomoslem 

In:

Out:

Esteghlal Ahvaz 

In:

Out:

Esteghlal 

In:

Out:

Foolad 

In:

Out:

Malavan 

In:

Out:

Mes Kerman 

In:

Out:

Moghavemat Sepasi 

In:

Out:

PAS Hamedan 

In:

Out:

Paykan 

In:

Out:

Persepolis 

In:

Out:

Rah Ahan 

In:

Out:

Sepahan 

In:

Out:

Saba Qom 

In:

Out:

Steel Azin 

In:

Out:

Tractor Sazi 

In:

Out:

Shahin Bushehr 

In:

Out:

Zob Ahan 

In:

Out:

Azadegan League

Aluminium Hormozgan  

In:

Out:

Bargh Shiraz 

In:

Out:

Damash Iranian 

In:

Out:

Damash Gilan 

In:

Out:

Gol Gohar 

In:

Out:

Gostaresh Foolad 

In:

Out:

Naft Tehran 

In:

Out:

Nassaji Mazandaran 

In:

Out:

Petrochimi Tabriz 

In:

 

Out:

Sanat Naft 

In:

Out:

Sanati Kaveh 

In:

Out:

Shahin Ahvaz 

In:

Out:

Shahrdari Tabriz 

In:

Out:

Shensa Arak 

In:

Out:

Shirin Faraz 

In:

Out:

References

transfers
Iran
2009-10